USS Carondelet (1861) was a  gunboat constructed for the War Department by James B. Eads during the American Civil War.  It was named for the town where it was built, Carondelet, Missouri.

Carondelet was designed for service on the western rivers, with a combination of shallow draft and variety of heavy guns (and a light howitzer), she was suited for riverside bombardment and ship-to-ship combat against Confederate gunboats.

Built in Carondelet Missouri in 1861 

USS Carondelet, an ironclad river gunboat, was built in 1861 by James Eads and Co., St. Louis, Missouri, at the Union Iron Works, in Carondelet, Missouri under contract to the United States Department of War. Carondelet was commissioned 15 January 1862, at Cairo, Illinois, U.S. Navy Commander Henry A. Walke in command, and reported to Army's Western Gunboat Flotilla, commanded by U.S. Navy Flag Officer Andrew Hull Foote.

Civil War service

Union Army service 

Union Navy service 

Transferred to Navy control with the other ships of her flotilla on 1 October 1862, Carondelet continued the rapid pace of her operations, taking part in the unsuccessful Steele's Bayou Expedition in March 1863.

One of those to pass the Vicksburg and Warrenton, Mississippi batteries in April 1863, Carondelet took part on 29 April in the five-and-a-half-hour engagement with the batteries at Grand Gulf. She remained on duty off Vicksburg, bombarding the city in its long siege from May to July. Without her and her sisters and other naval forces, the great operations on the rivers would not have been possible and the Federal victory might not have been won.

From 7 March to 15 May 1864, she sailed with the Red River Expedition, and during operations in support of Union Army movements ashore, took part in the Bell's Mill engagement (part of the Franklin-Nashville Campaign) of December 1864. For the remainder of the war, Carondelet patrolled in the Cumberland River.

Commanding Officers 
Carondelet had several commanding officers over the duration of her service.

During the Civil War four of Carondelets crew members were awarded the Medal of Honor: Signal Quartermaster Matthew Arther for actions at the Battles of Fort Henry and Fort Donelson, February 1862; Seaman John Dorman for actions in various engagements; Fireman Michael Huskey, for actions during Steele's Bayou Expedition, March 1863; and Coxswain John G. Morrison, for actions in the engagement with CSS Arkansas, 15 July 1862.

Post-war decommissioning and sale 

She was decommissioned at Mound City, Illinois, on 20 June 1865, and sold there on 29 November 1865.

Subsequent career and sinking 

In 1873, shortly before she was to be scrapped, a flood swept Carondelet from her moorings in Gallipolis, Ohio.  She then drifted approximately 130 miles down the Ohio River, where she grounded near Manchester, Ohio.  Her ultimate fate remained unknown until a May 1982 search operation by Clive Cussler's National Underwater and Marine Agency pinpointed the location of the wreckage, just two days after a dredge passed directly over the wreckage, demolishing most of the wrecked vessel.

Armament 
Like many of the Mississippi theatre ironclads, USS Carondelet had its armament changed multiple times over life of the vessel. To expedite the entrance of Carondelet into service, she and the other City-class gunboats were fitted with whatever weapons were available; then had their weapons upgraded as new pieces became available. Though the  Dahlgren smoothbore cannons were fairly modern most of the other original armaments were antiquated; such as the 32-pounders, or modified; such as the 42-pounder "rifles" which were in fact, old smoothbores that had been gouged out to give them rifling. These 42-pounder weapons were of particular concern to military commanders because they were structurally weaker and more prone to exploding than purpose-built rifled cannons. Additionally, the close confines of riverine combat greatly increased the threat of boarding parties. The 12-pounder howitzer was equipped to address that concern and was not used in regular combat.

See also 

 Union Navy
 Anaconda Plan
 Mississippi Squadron

References

Sources 
 Coombe, Jack, Thunder Along the Mississippi: The River Battles That Split The Confederacy (Book Sales Inc. 2005)
 Cussler, Clive and Craig Dirgo, The Sea Hunters (Simon & Schuster 1996)
 
 Smith, Myron J., Tinclads in the Civil War: Union light-Draught Gunboat Operations on Western Waters, 1862–1865 (McFarland 2009)

External links 

 Pictures of USS Carondelet (1862–1865)
 Bombardment of Fort Henry (Feb. 2-6, 1862)
 Building the City Class Ironclads Documentary

Ships built in St. Louis
Steamships of the United States Navy
Gunboats of the United States Navy
American Civil War patrol vessels of the United States
Shipwrecks of the Ohio River
Shipwrecks of the American Civil War
1861 ships
Ships of the Union Navy
Maritime incidents in May 1864